Nicholas Joseph Gonzales (born May 27, 1999) is an American baseball second baseman in the Pittsburgh Pirates organization. He was selected seventh overall by the Pirates in the 2020 Major League Baseball draft.

Amateur career
Gonzales attended Cienega High School in Vail, Arizona. During his career, he hit .399 with 89 runs batted in (RBIs).

As a freshman at New Mexico State in 2018, Gonzales hit .347/.425/.596 with nine home runs and 36 RBIs over 57 games. He was named the Western Athletic Conference Freshman of the Year. As a sophomore in 2019, he led the nation with a .432 batting average. He finished the season hitting .432/.532/.773 with 16 home runs and 80 RBIs. After the season, he played collegiate summer baseball for the Cotuit Kettleers of the Cape Cod League, where was named the MVP of the league after batting .351 with seven home runs over 42 games.

Gonzales entered his junior year in 2020 as a top prospect for the 2020 Major League Baseball draft. He batted .448 with 12 home runs over 16 games before the season was cancelled due to the COVID-19 pandemic.

Professional career
Gonzales was selected seventh overall by the Pittsburgh Pirates in the 2020 Major League Baseball draft. On June 23, Gonzales signed with the Pirates for a reported signing bonus of $5.4 million. He did not play a game after signing due to the cancellation of the season.

Gonzales made his professional debut in 2021 with the Greensboro Grasshoppers of the High-A East, slashing .302/.385/.565 with 18 home runs and 54 RBIs over eighty games. He missed over a month during the season due to a hand injury. He was selected to play in the Arizona Fall League for the Peoria Javelinas where he was named to the Fall Stars game.

References

External links

 New Mexico State Aggies bio

1999 births
Living people
People from Pima County, Arizona
Baseball players from Arizona
Baseball second basemen
New Mexico State Aggies baseball players
Cotuit Kettleers players
Greensboro Grasshoppers players
Altoona Curve players